David "Dave" Busfield (born 22 November 1953), also known by the nickname of  "Bussy"/"Buzzy", is an English former professional rugby league footballer who played in the 1970s and 1980s, and coached in the 1980s. He played at club level for Featherstone Rovers (Heritage № 514), Halifax (Heritage № 871), Wakefield Trinity (Heritage № 897), Hull F.C. (Heritage №), and Dewsbury, as a back, or forward, and coached at club level for Dewsbury, Batley and Royal Air Force (RL).

Background
Busfield was born in Shawcross, Dewsbury, West Yorkshire, England.

Playing career

Challenge Cup Final appearances
Dave Busfield played as an interchange/substitute, i.e. number 14, (replacing left-, i.e. number 11, Alan Rhodes) in Featherstone Rovers' 9–24 defeat by Warrington in the 1973–74 Challenge Cup Final during the 1973–74 season at Wembley Stadium, London on Saturday 11 May 1974, in front of a crowd of 77,400.

County Cup Final appearances
Dave Busfield played  in Halifax's 6-15 defeat by Leeds in the 1979–80 Yorkshire County Cup Final during the 1979–80 season at Headingley Rugby Stadium, Leeds on Saturday 27 October 1979.

References

External links
Maurice Bamford column
 (archived by web.archive.org) Stats → Past Players → B at hullfc.com
 (archived by web.archive.org) Statistics at hullfc.com

1953 births
Living people
Batley Bulldogs coaches
Dewsbury Rams coaches
Dewsbury Rams players
English rugby league coaches
English rugby league players
Featherstone Rovers players
Halifax R.L.F.C. players
Huddersfield Giants players
Hull F.C. players
Rugby league players from Dewsbury
Rugby league utility players
Wakefield Trinity players